Priyamaina Neeku is a 2001 Indian Telugu-language romantic comedy film written and directed by Balasekaran. The film stars Tarun, Sivaji, Sneha (in her Telugu debut) and Preetha, while Ali, Venu Madhav and Tanikella Bharani played the other important supporting roles. The film and the soundtrack received positive reviews upon release, and was a box office success.

On 24 January 2003, after the completion of reshooting few scenes, the film was dubbed and released in Tamil as Kadhal Sugamanathu, with Pyramid Natarajan playing Tarun's father and Livingston playing the comedian role of Ali. The Tamil version was also successful.

Plot 
Ganesh is a carefree college youth from Hyderabad (Tamil Version as Coimbatore), whose life revolves around friends and doing good deeds for them which upsets his father Raja Shekar. One day he fumbles upon a red diary in his father's auction shop. It is a diary left behind unknowingly by Sandhya.

The entire first half is narrated through the diary in this film. Sandhya is staying in the house opposite to that of Aishwarya, who is the sister of Ganesh. She falls in love with Ganesh after listening to his melodious guitar play. But Ganesh is unaware of her love and he never uses to interact with her. She is also a shy girl, who never let Ganesh know about her feelings. Sirisha is the younger sister of Sandhya, who is studying in a hostel. When she comes home for holidays, she envies Sandhya for loving Ganesh and she wanted to grab him from her. Sirisha assures Sandhya that she will liaison the love of Sandhya between Ganesh and her and plays a double game by playing tricks on Ganesh to attract him. Meanwhile, the father of Sandhya and Sirisha is transferred to Vizag (Chennai in Tamil Version). Sandhya asks Sirisha to tell Sandhya's love to Ganesh. Sirisha proposes to Ganesh and gets rejected. Sandhya, who witnessed the entire episode secretly, feels cheated by the betrayal of her own sister. At the same time, Sandhya stays away from proposing to Ganesh for the fear of rejection. The family of Sandhya moves to Vizag and in the transfer process, her diary gets misplaced.

After discovering that Sandhya is his secret admirer, Ganesh recognizes the purity in her love and wants to meet her and propose his love to her. He gets off to Vizag along with his best friend Chacha. There he finds a mutual friend named Raghu and stays in his house. Raghu is a rich bachelor from Bheemili (Virugambakkam in the Tamil version), who lives with his parents. As Ganesh explores his secret mission of finding Sandhya, Raghu gets engaged to the unwilling Sandhya. Later on Raghu learns that Ganesh is there to seek his silent admirer.

Ganesh knows that Raghu is marrying Sandhya. Being a good friend, he does not want to betray him. Sandhya has agreed to marriage since she does not want to make the things worse for her father and sister. But she still loves Ganesh. Sirisha wants to amend the mistake she has done. She searches for Ganesh to unite them. Things are still unsure and hazy as Sandhya and Raghu will marry in a few minutes. In the end, Sirisha tells everything and marries Raghu while Sandhya and Ganesh unite.

Cast 

 Tarun as Ganesh
 Sivaji as Raghu
 Sneha as Sandhya
 Preetha as Sirisha
 Venu Madhav as Chacha
 Tanikella Bharani as Raja Shekar, Ganesh's father
 Ali as Comic Thief
 Chandra Mohan as Shivarama Rao, Sandhya and Sirisha's father
 Jhansi as Aishwarya, Ganesh's elder sister
 Raja Ravindra as Karthik, Ganesh's brother-in-law
 Bandla Ganesh as Ravi, Ganesh's friend
 Rami Reddy as Comic Mental Musician
 Varsha as Priya, Raghu's younger sister
 Siva Parvathi as Ganesh's mother
 Babloo as Ganesh's friend
 Narra Venkateswara Rao as Vishwanathan, Raghu's father

Tamil version 

 Pyramid Natarajan as Srinivasan, Ganesh's father
 Livingston as Comic Thief
 Theni Kunjarammal as Grandma on road

Production 
Director Balasekaran announced in June 2000 that he would direct a romantic dramedy film, with Tarun Kumar roped to play the main lead. The film was titled Priyamaina Neeku in October 2000. Sneha was confirmed to play the female lead in August 2000 and she joined the sets thereafter. Sivaji agreed to play a parallel leading role in this film, as the hero's best friend. Ali, Rami Reddy and Venu Madhav were selected to play the comedians. The rest of the cast includes Tanikella Bharani, Preetha Vijayakumar and Raja Ravindra. The final schedule occurred in January 2001, a month before the film's release. Shooting of the film took place in and around Chennai, Visakhapatnam, Srikakulam and Hyderabad.

Soundtrack 
Music composed by Shiva Shankar. "Nelanadiga" is based on "Enna Azhagu" from the Tamil film Love Today (1997). The songs in Telugu and Tamil versions were same except the song "Nelanadiga", which was replaced in the Tamil version with "Adi Sugama Sugama Chudithaare". "Adi Sugama" was later reused as title song for Hindi film Pyaar Diwana Hota Hai also produced by R. B. Choudary.

Telugu Version

All lyrics are written by Sirivennela, Bhuvanachandra and Vasanth.

Tamil Version

All lyrics are written by Viveka.

Reception 
Jeevi of Idlebrain.com opined that "Because of the nature of story, this film went on a slow pace. He [Balasekaran] could have made the film little shorter. Nonetheless, he made sure that this film too have all the clean ingredients the youth is looking for". A critic from Full Hyderabad wrote that "Except for the idea the diary from which the movie unfolds, there is nothing novel about the film".

References

External links 
 

2000s musical comedy-drama films
2000s romantic musical films
2000s Telugu-language films
2001 comedy-drama films
2001 films
Films directed by Balasekaran
Films set in Hyderabad, India
Films shot in Hyderabad, India
Films shot in Visakhapatnam
Indian romantic comedy-drama films
Indian romantic musical films
Super Good Films films